Baby Bump(S) (original title : Telle mère, telle fille) is a French comedy film written and directed by Noémie Saglio.

Plot
A mother and her daughter, completely opposite, become pregnant simultaneously.

Cast 
 Juliette Binoche as Mado
 Camille Cottin as Avril
 Lambert Wilson as Marc
 Catherine Jacob as Irène
 Jean-Luc Bideau as Debulac
 Michael Dichter as Louis
 Stéfi Celma as Charlotte
 Philippe Vieux as Michel
 Olivia Côte as Cécile
 Charlie Dupont as Romain
 Hugues Jourdain as Eudes
 Sabine Pakora as Justine

Production 
The movie was shot from 13 June to 5 August 2016.

References

External links

2017 films
2017 comedy films
2010s French-language films
French comedy films
Gaumont Film Company films
2010s French films
French pregnancy films